The Stoddart Group is a stratigraphical unit of Mississippian to Early Pennsylvanian age in the Western Canadian Sedimentary Basin. 

It takes the name from the Stoddart Creek, a creek that flows into Charlie Lake north of Fort St. John, and was first described in well Pacific Fort St. John #23 (at depths from 2000 to 2600m) by A.T.C. Rutgers in 1958.

Lithology
The Formation is composed of both carbonate and clastic facies.

Distribution
It is present in the sub-surface from the foothills of the Northern Rockies and eastwards into the Peace River Country in north-western Alberta.

Subdivisions
The Stoddart Group is composed of the following formations, from top to bottom:

Relationship to other units
The Stoddart Group is overlain by the Ishbel Group in the foothills and the Prophet Formation in the northern plains; it  conformably overlays the Debolt Formation.

It can be correlated with the Tunnel Mountain Formation, the Kananaskis Formation, the Mattson Formation and the Mount Head Formation of the southern Canadian Rockies, and with the Amsden Formation in Montana.

References

Stratigraphy of Alberta
Stratigraphy of British Columbia